The 2003 Atlantic Sun men's basketball tournament was held March 6–8 at the GSU Sports Arena at Georgia State University in Atlanta, Georgia. 

 defeated  in the championship game, 80–69, to win their first Atlantic Sun men's basketball tournament.

The Trojans, therefore, received the Atlantic Sun's automatic bid to the 2003 NCAA tournament, their first appearance in the Division I tournament.

Format
The Atlantic Sun's membership remained fixed at twelve, so no changes to the format were required. As such, only the top eight teams from the conference tournament were eligible for the tournament. These eight teams were seeded based on regular season conference records.

Bracket

References

ASUN men's basketball tournament
Tournament
Atlantic Sun men's basketball tournament
Atlantic Sun men's basketball tournament